The Texas Code of Military Justice (TCMJ) is the foundation of military law in the State of Texas for the Texas Military. It was established by the Texas Legislature in accordance with the authority given by the Constitution of Texas.

Current subchapters 
The TCMJ is found in Title 4, Subtitle C, Chapter 432 of the Texas Government Code.

See also 

Uniform Code of Military Justice
Judge Advocate General's Corps
 Military law
 Military tribunal
 Military courtesy
 Laws of war
 War crime

References 

Texas Military Department